St Michael's Church is in Church Road, Garston, a district of Liverpool, Merseyside, England. It is an active Anglican parish church in the deanery of Liverpool South Childwall, the archdeaconry of Liverpool, and the diocese of Liverpool. The church is recorded in the National Heritage List for England as a designated Grade II listed building. It is located on an industrial site between gas holders and a railway.

History

The first church on the site was built in 1225, and the second in 1715. The present church was built between 1875 and 1877 and was designed by Thomas D. Berry and Son. The church has a historical connection with the Norris and the Watt families of Speke Hall.

Architecture

Exterior
St Michael's is built in buff rock-faced yellow sandstone with red ashlar dressings and slate roofs. Its plan consists of a nave with a clerestory, north and south aisles under lean-to roofs, a south porch, north and south transepts, a chancel with an apse and chapels, and a northwest tower. The tower has angle buttresses, and a north entrance with a crocketed hood, over which is a two-light window. Above this are clock faces on three sides, three bell openings, a frieze, a cornice, gargoyles, and an embattled parapet. At the west end is a three-light window containing Geometrical tracery, and along the sides of the aisles and clerestory are two-light windows. The windows in the transepts have four lights, and those in the chapels have three lights. The chapel and the porch are gabled.

Interior
In the church, the reredos has panels containing opus sectile and mosaic. Around the church are Stations of the Cross designed as a frieze by May L. G. Cooksey. In the chancel are windows containing stained glass dated 1886 by Shrigley and Hunt. The original two-manual pipe organ was built by Franklin Lloyd. It has been superseded by another two-manual organ, this installed by Rushworth and Dreaper in 1938, and rebuilt by the same company in 1967. There is a ring of eight bells, cast by John Warner & Sons in 1877 and 1878. There is also a Sanctus bell of 1882 by the same company.

External features

In the churchyard is a shaft, dating possibly from the 17th century, and maybe part of a sundial.

See also

Grade II listed buildings in Liverpool-L19

References

Churches in Liverpool
Grade II listed buildings in Liverpool
Grade II listed churches in Merseyside
Anglican Diocese of Liverpool
Church of England church buildings in Merseyside
Gothic Revival church buildings in England
Gothic Revival architecture in Merseyside
Churches completed in 1877